Theatre of War is an original novel written by Justin Richards and based on the long-running British science fiction television series Doctor Who. It features the Seventh Doctor, Ace and Bernice. It also introduces the recurring character of Irving Braxiatel. A prelude to the novel, also written by Richards, appeared in Doctor Who Magazine #212.

Synopsis
An archeological expedition to the planet Menaxus ends in tragedy; all but one of the visitors die and lethal radiation contaminates the surface. Now the survivor is leading a new trip, with Professor Bernice Summerfield. Murders start again. Bernice summons her friends, the Doctor and Ace. They are sucked into a dangerously real re-creation of Shakespeare's play, Hamlet, which is paralleled by The Good Soldiers, the (fictitious) purportedly lost play of the future playwright Stanoff Osterling.

Audio adaption
Big Finish Productions released an audio dramatisation of the book in December 2015 alongside an audio dramatisation of All-Consuming Fire. The audio play reunited Sylvester McCoy, Sophie Aldred and Lisa Bowerman as the Seventh Doctor, Ace, Bernice. Miles Richardson also reprised his role as Irving Braxiatel; having previously played the role in the Bernice Summerfield and Gallifrey audio series for Big Finish.

External links
Theatre of War Prelude

1994 British novels
1994 science fiction novels
Virgin New Adventures
Novels by Justin Richards
Seventh Doctor novels